Guillermo Barreto (August 11, 1929 – December 14, 1991) was a Cuban drummer and timbalero. He was a major figure in the Cuban music scene for more than fifty years and one of the first drummers in Cuba to play Afro-Cuban jazz.

Nicknames
Like many Cuban musicians, Guillermo Barreto had several nicknames. He was usually credited as "Barretico" during the 1950s and 1960s. He was also known as "El Loro" (The Parrot) and "Pata de loro" (Parrot leg) "due to his constant chatter and parrotlike walk", a nickname given to him by Rita Montaner according to Paquito D'Rivera.

Biography

Early life and career
Barreto was born in Havana on August 11, 1929. His father was Primo Barreto, a clarinetist who taught music to all of his children: Lita, Josefina, Estela, Alejandro "Coco", Roberto "Bobby", and Guillermo. As a young man, Guillermo became a skilled interpreter of Cuban pailas. In the 1940s, he was part of several big bands: the Cabaret Tropicana resident orchestra (directed by Obdulio Morales), the Sans Souci resident orchestra (directed by Rafael Ortega) and Armando Romeu González's orchestra. Soon he was playing his own arrangements and compositions. Between 1943 and 1946, he studied piano under the supervision of Rafael Ortega. This swing background would allow him to take his music into the realm of Afro-Cuban jazz as part of the Quinteto Instrumental de Música Moderna, which he founded in 1958 alongside Frank Emilio Flynn. He was so highly regarded that during a visit to Cuba by Stan Kenton's orchestra, Guillermo replaced an ill Buddy Rich for one night's performance.

Descarga and Afro-Cuban jazz 

Inspired by bop drummers like Max Roach and Roy Haynes, by the early 1950s, Guillermo would organize the Sunday afternoon jam sessions (known as descargas) at the legendary Cabaret Tropicana (featuring stars such as Bebo Valdés), often doing the transcription necessary to explain American jazz music to his band mates to play. He played in Cachao's famous 1957 sessions, and in 1959 the first Quinteto Instrumental de Música Moderna LP came out under the name Grupo Cubano de Música Moderna. By the early 1960s, he was amongst the most prolific drummers in the Cuban jazz scene, playing with the likes of Chucho Valdés, Fernando Mulens, Peruchín and, since 1967, the all-star big band known as Orquesta Cubana de Música Moderna.

The Quinteto Instrumental de Música Moderna, "which quickly gained stature as a benchmark in Cuban Latin jazz history", would later evolve into Los Amigos in the 1980s. The band would include guest musicians such as Miguel O'Farrill and Elio Valdés, and they backed singer Merceditas Valdés, Barreto's wife since the late 1950s.

Friends with another younger Cuban drummer, Hilario Durán, (Hilario worked with Guillermo in the Orquesta Cubana de Música Moderna) in 1991, he introduced Hilario to the Canadian flautist Jane Bunnett. Both men then went on to appear on her famous Afro-Cuban recording Spirits of Havana.

Death 
On December 14, 1991, two months after the recording of Spirits of Havana, Barreto died in his hometown, Havana. His wife died on June 13, 1996.

Barreto has been considered a notable influence by many Cuban drummers such as Conrado "Coky" García.

Discography 

With Jane Bunnett
Spirits of Havana (Messidor, 1993)

With Cachao
Cuban Jam Sessions in Miniature "Descargas" (Panart, 1957)

With Frank Emilio / Quinteto Instrumental de Música Moderna / Los Amigos
Grupo Cubano de Música Moderna (Panart, 1959; reissued by EGREM, 1964)
Drume negrita (Areito, 1964; EP)
Jazz 6 PM (Areito, 1964)
Algo bueno (Areito, 1964; EP)
Color y ritmo (Areito, 1964)
Rico melao (Areito, 1964)
Estos son Los Amigos (Siboney, 1982)
Los Amigos (Warner Music, 2007; archival, recorded 1960-75)
Complete Recordings 1960-1962 (Yemayá, 2007; recorded 1960-62)

With Juanito Márquez / Combo Siboney
Cuba Sax Cha-Cha (Velvet, 1960)
Descarga latina (Discmedi, 1995; archival, recorded in 1966)

With Fernando Mulens
Piano y ritmo (Areito, 1964)

With Chico O'Farrill
Chico's Cha Cha Cha (Panart, 1957)

With Orquesta Cubana de Música Moderna
Consejo Nacional de Cultura (Areito, 1967)

With Peruchín
Piano con moña (Gema, 1960)

With Tojo
Ritmo (Kubaney, 1957)

With Chucho Valdés
Por la libre (Areito, 1964; EP)
Jazz nocturno (Areito, 1964)

With Los Zafiros
Bossa Cubana (World Circuit, 1999; recorded 1963-67)

Tributes 
Havana Drum Festival: Celebration of the drum in memoriam Guillermo Barreto (Amadeo Roldán Theater, November 5–10, 2002)

Notes

References

External links 
Guillermo Barreto, EcuRed.
Guillermo Barreto, Rate Your Music.
Guillermo Barreto, Discogs.

1929 births
1991 deaths
Cuban percussionists
Cuban jazz percussionists
People from Havana
Timbaleros
20th-century drummers